Back Like We Left Something is the second full-length studio album by UTP. It is their fourth release overall including the 2002 compilation The Compilation and 2004 EP Nolia Clap, released on July 24, 2007 through Rap-a-Lot Records.

Background
The album was released over three years after The Beginning of the End. By the time of the album's release group founder Juvenile had left the group, leaving UTP as a duo consisting of Wacko and Skip. However, Juvenile still contributed verses to four tracks on the album, "Damn Nigga Damn", "Loaded Up", "1st Piece" and "Gang Bang".

Chartwise, the album was an improvement over their last release Nolia Clap, peaking at 52 on the Billboard Top R&B/Hip-Hop Albums. However it failed to reach the Billboard 200 or produce any hit singles like The Beginning of the End did.

Track listing 

 Juvenile is credited as a featured artist as he was not a UTP member at the time of the album's release.

Charts

Personnel 

 Pharren Lowther - Producer, Engineer, Audio Production 
 Cory Mo - Audio Production 
 Mike Dean - Producer, Audio Production 
 Myke Diesel - Producer, Audio Production 
 II Deep Muzik - Audio Production
 Sinista - Producer, Audio Production

 
 Bigg Tyme - Audio Production
 Polow da Don - Audio Production 
 Tony Randle - A&R 
 Sinista - Audio Production

References

2007 albums
Asylum Records albums
Rap-A-Lot Records albums
UTP (group) albums
Albums produced by Mike Dean (record producer)